Louis Guiyano Chiffone (born February 18, 1988 in Mauritius) is a Mauritian football player who currently plays for Savanne SC in the Mauritian League. He has also played for the Mauritius national football team. He is featured on the Mauritian national team in the official 2010 FIFA World Cup video game.

References 

Living people
1988 births
Mauritius international footballers
Mauritian footballers
Savanne SC players
Association football midfielders